Mali–Russia relations are the bilateral relations between Mali and Russia.

Background

Soviet-era relations
The Soviet Union recognised the independence of Mali on 7 July 1960, and diplomatic relations between the two states were established on 14 October 1960. Following the collapse of the Mali Federation, and due to French support for Senegal, Modibo Keïta, the first President of Mali, sought closer ties with the Soviet Union. In 1961 the two countries signed trade and cultural pacts, and the Soviet Union granted Mali loans and other aid, which included the acquisition of two Ilyushin Il-18 passenger aircraft for Air Mali. Under the cultural agreement Russia sent circus performers, sports coaches and a soccer team to Mali.

When Keïta was overthrown by Moussa Traoré by a coup d'état in 1968, Traoré improved relations with France and other Western countries, but Mali remained dependent on the Soviet Union for the arming and training of its military. Approximately 50 Soviet military advisors provided armour, artillery and parachute training to Mali's military, and trained all of Mali's pilots. The Soviets also improved the Malian Air Force base in Mopti, and occasionally used Malian airfields to stage supply flights for groups it supported in Angola.

Russian Federation relations

Diplomatic ties

On 16 January 1992, Mali recognised the Russian Federation as the successor state of the Soviet Union, after the latter's dissolution. Russia has an embassy in Bamako, and Mali has an embassy in Moscow. The current Ambassador of Russia to Mali is Anatoly Pavlovich Smirnov, who presented his Letters of Credence to President of Mali Amadou Toumani Touré on 4 November 2005. The current Ambassador of Mali to Russia is Bréhima Coulibaly, who presented his Letters of Credence to Russian President Dmitry Medvedev on 16 January 2009.

Russian involvement in the 2020 Malian coup d'état has been speculated.

Political ties
In 2003 in Bamako from April 30, 2003 to May 1, 2003 meetings were held by Alexander Makarenko, Director of the Africa Department of the Russian Ministry of Foreign Affairs, with N. L. Traore, Secretary General of the Ministry of Foreign Affairs and International Cooperation of Mali.
In 2005 Anatoly Safonov, the Special Presidential Representative for International Cooperation in the Fight Against Terrorism and Cross-Border Organized Crime, met from January 25, 2005 through January 28, 2005  in Bamako with his Mali counterpart.

References

External links
  Documents on the Mali–Russia relationship from the Russian Ministry of Foreign Affairs

 
Africa–Russia relations
Russia
Bilateral relations of Russia